The West African batis (Batis occulta) is a species of bird in the family Platysteiridae.
It is found in Cameroon, Central African Republic, Republic of the Congo, Ivory Coast, Equatorial Guinea, Gabon, Ghana, Liberia, Nigeria, and Sierra Leone.
Its natural habitat is subtropical or tropical moist lowland forests.
It is sometimes considered a subspecies of the Fernando Po batis.

References

West African batis
Birds of West Africa
West African batis
Taxonomy articles created by Polbot